The King George VI Memorial Chapel is part of St George's Chapel at Windsor Castle. The chapel was commissioned by Queen Elizabeth II in 1962 as a burial place for her father, King George VI, and was completed in 1969. It contains the final resting places of King George VI, Queen Elizabeth The Queen Mother, Queen Elizabeth II, Prince Philip, Duke of Edinburgh, and the ashes of Princess Margaret. It was designed by George Pace.

History 
The chapel was commissioned by Queen Elizabeth II in 1962. The architects of the chapel were commissioned to design it to accommodate the remains of three monarchs and their consorts. Her private secretary wrote to the Dean of Windsor, Robin Woods, in December 1962 with two requests. The first was that the Queen's eldest son, Prince Charles, be prepared for confirmation, and the second was that a specific resting place be found for her father, King George VI. Following his funeral service at St George's Chapel, George's remains had been transferred to the royal vault beneath the chapel. George's death was unexpected, and no specific resting place had been designated for him.

Her request was not acted upon for a further five years, as the Queen wanted her mother, George's widow, Queen Elizabeth The Queen Mother, to avoid the painful experience of burying her husband for a second time. She also disliked the idea of a marble chest tomb with life-sized effigies that were typically commissioned for the remains of monarchs and preferred simple slabs inlaid into the floor. There was no space for another vault to be constructed in St George's Chapel and so a solution was found with the construction of an additional chantry chapel to the exterior of St George's Chapel. This was the first addition to St George's Chapel since the completion of the chantry on the south side of the chapel for Oliver King, the private secretary to Henry VII in 1504.

Design 
The initial plan for the new chapel was rejected by the Royal Fine Arts Commission. It involved the construction of a small rectangular chantry into the north wall of the nave to a design by Paul Paget and John Seely, 2nd Baron Mottistone. The second plan submitted for the design of the chapel was approved. It was proposed by the architect George Pace and involved the construction of a chantry chapel between the Rutland Chapel and the north choir of St George's Chapel. It was completed in 1969. The chapel stands between two of the external buttresses of the north wall of the quire, and it is made from stone from Clipsham in Rutland. The red and blue stained-glass windows of the chapel were designed by John Piper and made by Patrick Reyntiens. The roof of the chapel is painted in black and white and decorated with embedded gold leaf. An altar in the chapel has a bronze relief portrait of George VI by Sir William Reid Dick, a replica of the portrait of George which hangs in the church of St Mary Magdalene on the royal estate of Sandringham in Norfolk. The completed chapel was described by Robin Woods, Dean of Windsor, as continuing "the perpendicular Gothic designs of the chapel itself, but in a twentieth century idiom". There is an interment chamber directly beneath the chapel in which the remains are placed.

Interments

King George VI (1969) 

George's remains were transferred to the newly constructed memorial chapel, named in his honour, on 24 March 1969. The chapel was built at a cost of £25,000, entirely funded by Elizabeth II. It was dedicated on 31 March 1969 in a ceremony attended by George's widow, Queen Elizabeth The Queen Mother and their daughter Queen Elizabeth II, with her husband Prince Philip, Duke of Edinburgh, and their eldest children, Prince Charles and Princess Anne. The former king, Edward VIII, was not invited to the ceremony. Louis Mountbatten, 1st Earl Mountbatten of Burma was absent due to his attendance at the funeral of the former President of the United States, Dwight D. Eisenhower. The ceremony was also attended by the Knights of the Garter.

The chapel is marked by gates of wrought iron inscribed with the words "I said to the man who stood at the gate of the year: 'Give me a light that I may tread safely into the unknown'," from the 1908 poem "The Gate of the Year" by Minnie Louise Haskins. The words were notably quoted by George VI in his Royal Christmas Message of 1939.

Princess Margaret, Countess of Snowdon and Queen Elizabeth The Queen Mother (2002) 
The ashes of George's younger daughter, Princess Margaret, Countess of Snowdon, were placed in the royal vault of St George's Chapel on 15 February 2002. Margaret was the first member of the royal family to be cremated since Princess Louise, Duchess of Argyll, in 1939. She was cremated to ensure that her remains could be accommodated in the small interment chamber beneath the chapel. George's widow, Queen Elizabeth The Queen Mother, was interred beneath the chapel on 9 April 2002 following her funeral at Westminster Abbey. Margaret's ashes were placed in her parents' tomb at the same time. With the royal monogram representing Margaret carved below the inscriptions, Margaret's tombstone is now placed separately in the right-hand corner of the chapel and reads:

Queen Elizabeth II and Prince Philip, Duke of Edinburgh  (2022) 
On 19 September 2022, in a private service attended only by members of the royal family, Elizabeth II was interred beneath the memorial chapel following her state funeral at Westminster Abbey earlier that day. Elizabeth's husband, Philip, who died in 2021, had been placed in the royal vault of St George's Chapel following his funeral at the chapel. He was also then interred beneath the King George VI Memorial Chapel along with his wife. After their interments, a replacement ledger stone with an additional metal star of the Order of the Garter between the couples' names was put into the floor of the chapel. The ledger now reads:

References

External links

 Royal burials in the Chapel by location

1969 establishments in England
Burial monuments and structures in the United Kingdom
Elizabeth II
George VI
House of Windsor
Modernist architecture in England
Prince Philip, Duke of Edinburgh
Princess Margaret, Countess of Snowdon
Queen Elizabeth The Queen Mother
Religious buildings and structures completed in 1969
Stone buildings in the United Kingdom
Windsor Castle